John D. Kemp is an American disability rights leader who co-founded the American Association of People with Disabilities and is currently the president and chief executive of the Lakeshore Foundation in Birmingham, Alabama.

Owing to a congenital anomaly he was born without arms and legs and uses four prostheses, and he is widely respected for inspiring and empowering people with disabilities. He has occupied several top posts in the leading disability and nonprofit organizations. In 2011 he was hired as president and CEO of the Viscardi Center and the Henry Viscardi School.

Awards 
In 1991, he received the Horatio Alger Award of Horatio Alger Association of Distinguished Americans.
In 2006, he received the Henry B. Betts Award, America's top award in disability leadership.
In 2014, his contributions were recognized with the Dole Leadership Prize by the Elizabeth Dole Foundation

See also
 Viscardi Center
 Henry Viscardi School
 Henry Viscardi Achievement Awards

References

External links
 The Viscardi Center

American disability rights activists
American people with disabilities
Living people
1949 births